Jibon Niye Khela (translation: Playing with life) is a 1999 Bengali film directed by Anjan Choudhury. The film attained mass attention as it deals with the corruption in Healthcare sector of West Bengal. The film features Ranjit Mallick, Biplab Chatterjee, Manoj Mitra, Debashree Roy, Subhendu Chatterjee, Chumki Chowdhury, Haradhan Bandopadhyay, Arjun Chakraborty, Lokesh Ghosh and others. Cinematographer of the film was Shyamal Banerjee. The music of the film was composed by Tapan Chakraborty, background music was scored and lyrics were penned by Leela Choudhury.

Plot 
The movie revolves around an imaginary village called Haridevpur where Dr. Subhankar Sanyal (Ranjit Mallick) arrives as the head doctor of a Dharampur State Hospital, who is a specialist in each field. He tries to break the previous rules made in an agreement between the Super, (Manoj Mitra), and Dr. Sen, (Haradhan Bandopadhyay), because of which he faces many difficulties. By creating various hardships in his daily life, the Super and Dr. Sen try to remove him from the hospital. They succeed in this act by passing out his transfer to some other place. But they were confronted by the villagers who try to prevent him from leaving the village.

Cast
Ranjit Mallick as Dr. Shubhankar Sanyal
Debashree Roy as Minoti Samanta
Subhendu Chatterjee as Ex Minister Pratap Samanta
Supriya Devi (Guest appearance) as Shubhankar's Mother
Haradhan Bandopadhyay
Manoj Mitra as a corrupt official
Biplab Chatterjee
Arjun Chakraborty
Lokesh Ghosh as Runu
Chumki Chowdhury as Rekha
Rina Choudhury as Madhuri Sanyal
Rita Koiral
Gita Dey

References

External links
 

1999 films
Bengali-language Indian films
1990s Bengali-language films
Films directed by Anjan Choudhury